Nigel Austin (born September 24, 1970) is an Australian business and horse racing entrepreneur. Austin is the founder and majority owner of the Cotton On Group clothing and stationery group with brands including Cotton On, Supre, Factorie and Typo. Austin owns 90% of the company with a net worth that Forbes Asia estimates at $1.36 billion.

Early life 
Austin grew up in Geelong, Victoria. Austin's late father, Grant Austin, ran a publicly traded clothing wholesale and import business called the Austin Group, where Austin started out learning about the fashion industry in his school holidays.  From the age of 8 he knew he wanted to work in retail and looked up to his father.

In 1988, at the Beckley Markets in Geelong Austin started selling acid-washed denim jackets from the trunk of his Ford Bronco car. In his first outing at the market he sold one jacket for $30. The following week he returned with a cheaper offer, after he negotiated with his father who was the supplier, which resulted in all 20 selling out. Austin enrolled in university to study business but dropped out after a year to focus on his growing garment business. He didn't tell his father that he had dropped out for an entire year and could prove his business was booming.

His great grandmother founded The Austin Hospital in 1882 as a charitable institution for incurables. It had several name changes before becoming the Austin Hospital.

Career 
In 1991, Austin's first store was small space in Geelong behind a butcher shop run by his grandfather and he sourced merchandise from his father. He told Forbes: "The rent was $110 a week; the philosophy [was to] keep the risk as low as possible. My goal for the first year was to make $2,000 a week. If I could make [that] then I could make $100,000 a year.". His cousin, Ashley Hardwick, joined his venture a year later and they raised enough money to open more stores largely leveraging his fathers supply connections. Some of those connections still work with his company to this day. It took fifteen years for the group to expand to more than fifty stores across Australia, but today stores are found around the world. The first international store was in New Zealand and has since been followed by locations such as South Africa, Malaysia, Hong Kong and USA.

Austin and the Cotton On Group started the Cotton On Foundation to support healthcare and education in nations such as Uganda. The foundation was started after the baptism of Austin's first son in 2007, when he was asked by the local Parish in Geelong to make a donation to a healthcare centre in the small village of Mannya in Southern Uganda. Money is raised through selling specially branded merchandise in group stores such as bracelets, water bottles and tote bags.

Personal life 
Austin has six children, three of those born with ex-wife Tania Austin who is the CEO of women's fashion brand, Decjuba. His current wife is Melanie Austin.

Austin is involved in horse racing and owns Rosemont Stud, over 566 hectares in Gnarwarre and Ceres, Victoria. The logo of the stud is a red and white gatecrasher, that originally was the logo for the Cotton On chain in its early years.

References 

Living people

Australian billionaires
Australian businesspeople in fashion
Australian businesspeople in retailing
Australian racehorse owners and breeders
1970 births